Set Enterprises, Inc. was a game publishing company based in Fountain Hills, Arizona, USA. Two of its games won in the annual Mind Games competition American Mensa.

In April 2019, PlayMonster acquired Set Enterprises.

Games 
 SET, a visual perception matching card game that involves cards depicting shapes.
 Set Cubed, a board game where SETs are made by combining the dice in a player's hand with SETs already on the board.
 SET Electronic Handheld, an electronic handheld version of the game SET.
 SET The Computer Game, a computer version of the game SET.
 Quiddler, a rummy-based card game involving spelling.
 Xactika, a trick-taking card game involving cards that have four suits each.
 Five Crowns, a rummy-based card game involving five suits and wild cards.
 Trilogy, the visual challenge of SET that involves rummy and the action of war.
 Jurassic Jumble, a blind trading game that involves dinosaurs.
 Zangle, a shape-matching card game – won the "Best of Toy Fair 2019" award at the 2019 American International Toy Fair.

References

External links 
Set Enterprises homepage

Card game publishing companies
Companies based in Arizona